Tillandsia lucida is a species of flowering plant in the genus Tillandsia. This species is native to Mexico, Guatemala, Nicaragua, and Honduras.

Cultivars
 Tillandsia 'Discovery'

References

lucida
Flora of Central America
Flora of Mexico
Plants described in 1889